Ramblin' on My Mind is the debut studio album by American singer-songwriter Lucinda Williams, released in 1979, by Folkways Records.

Produced by Tom Royals, and recorded in Mississippi in the late 1970s, the album features a collection of traditional folk and country standards arranged and performed by Williams, with accompaniment by John Grimaudo on his six-string guitar. When the album was re-issued on CD in 1991 by Smithsonian Folkways, the title was shortened to Ramblin and featured an alternate album cover.

Background and reception

Smithsonian Folkways says her "Southern blues roots are unmistakable on her debut record [...] showcasing the artistry that would make her an icon." 

Trouser Press called it "a warm, lively album of covers" that "shows off Williams’ affecting vocals and her roots — from the bayou to the church choir to the Opry".

Track listing
Credits adapted from the album's liner notes.Side one"Ramblin' on My Mind" (Robert Johnson) – 2:30
"Me and My Chauffeur" (Clifton Chenier, Memphis Minnie) – 3:12
"Motherless Children" (Traditional) – 3:31
"Malted Milk Blues" (Robert Johnson) – 2:29
"Disgusted" (Melvin Jackson) – 2:28
"Jug Band Music" (Memphis Jug Band) – 2:22
"Stop Breakin' Down" (Robert Johnson) – 3:20Side two'
"Drop Down Daddy" (Sleepy John Estes, Hammie Nixon; originally "Drop Down Mama") – 3:23
"Little Darling Pal of Mine" (A.P. Carter) – 2:59
"Make Me Down a Pallet on Your Floor" (Traditional) – 3:50
"Jambalaya (On the Bayou)" (Hank Williams) – 3:05
"Great Speckled Bird" (Roy Acuff, A.P. Carter, Reverend Guy Smith, Traditional) – 2:55
"You're Gonna Need That Pure Religion" (Traditional) – 2:55
"Satisfied Mind" (Joe Hayes, Jack Rhodes) – 4:06

Personnel
Lucinda Williamsvocals, 12-string guitar
John Grimaudo6-string acoustic guitar
Technical
Gerald "Wolf" Stephenson - engineer
Carol Hardycover

References

External links 
 
Lucinda Williams Official Website

Lucinda Williams albums
1979 albums
1979 debut albums
Smithsonian Folkways albums
Covers albums